James Zuill Bailey, better known as Zuill Bailey (born 1972) is a Grammy Award-winning American cellist, chamber musician, and artistic director.
A graduate of the Peabody Institute of the Johns Hopkins University and the Juilliard School, he has appeared with major orchestras internationally.
He is a professor of cello at the University of Texas at El Paso.  Bailey has an exclusive international recording contract with the Telarc label.

Biography
As a concerto soloist, Bailey has performed with the symphony orchestras of 
Chicago, 
Dallas, 
Los Angeles, 
San Francisco, 
Buffalo, 
Ft. Worth, 
Louisville, 
Milwaukee, 
Minnesota, 
North Carolina,
Toronto, and 
Utah.
He has collaborated with conductors
Alan Gilbert, 
Andrew Litton, 
Grant Llewellyn, 
Itzhak Perlman, 
James De Preist, and 
Stanisław Skrowaczewski, 
and has performed with 
the pianist Leon Fleisher, 
the Juilliard String Quartet, 
the violinist Jaime Laredo, 
and cellists Lynn Harrell, Janos Starker and David Martín.

In his sold-out New York recital debut, Bailey performed the complete 
Beethoven sonatas with pianist Simone Dinnerstein at the Metropolitan Museum of Art.
He has appeared at the 
Walt Disney Concert Hall, 
Kennedy Center, 
Alice Tully Hall, 
the 92nd Street Y, and 
Carnegie Hall, where he made his debut performing the U.S. premiere of Mikis Theodorakis' Rhapsody for Cello and Orchestra.

Zuill Bailey is a member of the Perlman/Quint/Bailey Trio, along with pianist Navah Perlman and violinist Philippe Quint. He performs regularly with long-time duo partner pianist Awadagin Pratt.

Zuill Bailey is a recording artist for Telarc. 
His recording of the Bach Cello Suites recording was No. 1 on the Classical Billboard Charts. Other recordings on Telarc feature "Brahms" complete works for cello and piano with pianist Awadagin Pratt, and Russian Masterpieces showcasing the works of Tchaikovsky and Shostakovich performed with the San Francisco Ballet Orchestra. Other recordings include his live performance of the Dvořák Cello Concerto with the Indianapolis Symphony Orchestra, and "Spanish Masters," CD for Zenph studios in recordings with the late composer Manuel de Falla. His discography also includes a debut recital disc for Delos, Cello Quintets of Boccherini and Schubert with Janos Starker, Saint-Saëns' Cello Concertos No. 1 and 2 "Live", and the Korngold Cello Concerto with Kaspar Richter and the Bruckner Orchestra Linz for ASV. Kalmus Music Masters have released "Zuill Bailey Performance Editions"  which will encompass the core repertoire of cello literature

Network television appearances include a recurring role on the HBO series, Oz, in addition to features on NBC, A&E, NHK in Japan, a live broadcast of the Beethoven Triple Concerto from Mexico City, and the televised production of the Cuban premiere of Victor Herbert's Cello Concerto No. 2 with the National Orchestra of Cuba. He has been heard on NPR's Performance Today, Saint Paul Sunday, BBC's In Tune, XM Radio's Live from Studio II, Sirius Satellite Radio, and RTHK Radio Hong Kong.

Zuill Bailey performs on a 1693 Matteo Gofriller Cello, formerly owned by Mischa Schneider of the 
Budapest String Quartet. In addition to extensive touring engagements, Bailey is the Artistic Director of 
El Paso Pro Musica, is Artistic Director of Northwest BachFest in Spokane, WA, is the Artistic Director of the Sitka Music Festival, is the Artistic Director for Juneau Jazz & Classics, and Professor of Cello at the University of Texas at El Paso.

In 2016, Bailey was nominated for and won a Grammy award in the category of Best Classical Instrumental Solo for his recording of American composer Michael Daugherty's cello concerto Tales of Hemingway, recorded by the Nashville Symphony; the composition also garnered Grammys in the categories of Best Contemporary Classical Composition and Best Classical Compendium.

Discography
 Bach Cello Suites, Two Volumes, Zuill Bailey (cello), (2021) Octave Records
 Prokofiev Sinfonia Concertante and Cello Sonata, Zuill Bailey (cello), NC Symphony, Natasha Paremski (piano) (2016)
 Daugherty Tales of Hemingway for Cello and Orchestra (2016), Zuill Bailey (cello)
 Elgar Cello Concerto, (2013), Zuill Bailey (cello)
 Dvořák Cello Concerto, (2012), Zuill Bailey (cello)
 The Spanish Masters, Manuel De Falla (2011), Zuill Bailey (cello)
 Brahms, (2011), Zuill Bailey (cello), Awadagin Pratt (piano)
 Bach Cello Suites, (2010), Zuill Bailey (cello)
 Beethoven: Zuill Bailey and Simone Dinnerstein, (2009), Zuill Bailey (cello), Simone Dinnerstein (piano)
 Russian Masterworks CD (pieces by Tchaikovsky and Shostakovich with San Francisco Ballet Orchestra, (2009), Zuill Bailey (cello)
Piano trios by Schubert and Shostakovich, with pianist Navah Perlman and violinist Giora Schmidt, (2008).  Telarc CD
 Arensky & Dohnanyi: with Special Guest Lynn Harrell, (2007), Giora Schmidt (violin), Kirsten Johnson (viola), Zuill Bailey (cello), Soovin Kim (violin), Lynn Harrell (cello)
 Saint-Saëns Cello Concertos with the Roanoke Symphony Orchestra, (2005), Zuill Bailey (cello)
 Janos Starker Celebration - Schubert & Boccherini, (2005), Janos Starker (cello), Kirsten Johnson (viola), Zuill Bailey (cello), Soovin Kim (violin), Kurt Nikkanen (violin)
 Zuill Bailey: Debut Solo CD, (2003), Zuill Bailey (cello)
 Erich Wolfgang Korngold: Cello Concerto, (2003), Zuill Bailey (cello), Bruckner Orchestra Linz/Caspar Richter, ASV
The Rose Album, performing David Popper's Requiem for Three Cellos and Piano opus 66, with cellists Matt Haimovitz and Sara Sant'Ambrogio, and pianist Navah Perlman (2002).  Oxingale Records CD OX2002'''

References

External links
Official Site
Colbert Artists Management, Inc. - Zuill Bailey
"CONVERSATION WITH ZUILL BAILEY", Tim Janof
Zuill performing in Mexico City
 
   BACH & friends Documentary 

Living people
American classical cellists
American music educators
Texas classical music
University of Texas at El Paso faculty
Musicians from Alexandria, Virginia
1972 births
Peabody Institute alumni
Classical musicians from Virginia